Brandon Buck (born August 16, 1988) is a Canadian former professional ice hockey Forward player who is currently retired. He most recently played under contract for the then Thomas Sabo Ice Tigers of the Deutsche Eishockey Liga (DEL).

Playing career
Undrafted, Buck played major junior hockey with the Guelph Storm of the Ontario Hockey League.

On June 14, 2011 Buck left North America and pursued a European career, signing for Norwegian club, Sparta Warriors of the GET-ligaen. He previously played in the American Hockey League with the Norfolk Admirals and the Houston Aeros.

As a free agent on, July 6, 2012, Buck signed for Croatian team, KHL Medveščak Zagreb, who competed in their last season in Austrian Hockey League that season. At the conclusion of the season in Austria on April 19, 2013, Buck and his teammate, Kyle Greentree from KHL Medveščak, moved to the Swiss National League B with EHC Basel.

On July 18, 2014, Buck continued his journeyman European career, moving to the German DEL, in signing a contract with ERC Ingolstadt. In the 2014–15 season, Buck scored an impressive 28 goals and 59 points in 51 games. He led the club again offensively in the playoffs, scoring 20 points in 18 games in a defeat in the Championship final. After initially signing a two-year extension earlier in the season, Buck's importance to the club was signalled after he was signed to a further contract to remain in Ingolstadt through to the 2020 on August 8, 2015. He amassed a total of 186 points (79 goals, 107 assists) in 183 appearances for ERC before leaving the team in December 2017 to move to HC Davos of the Swiss National League. In February 2018, Buck parted ways with Davos and signed with the Vienna Capitals of the Austrian Hockey League (EBEL).

On April 22, 2018, Buck returned to the DEL as a free agent, securing an optional three-year deal with the Thomas Sabo Ice Tigers.

International play
Brandon Buck has played several times for the Canadian national team. He played for Team Canada in the Deutschland Cup 2014 & 2016, he also participated in the scouting tournaments of Team Canada's olympic preparation.

Career statistics

References

External links

1988 births
Living people
Canadian ice hockey left wingers
EHC Basel players
HC Davos players
Florida Everblades players
Guelph Storm players
Houston Aeros (1994–2013) players
ERC Ingolstadt players
KHL Medveščak Zagreb players
Norfolk Admirals players
Sparta Warriors players
Thomas Sabo Ice Tigers players
Vienna Capitals players